Ashley Johnston (born 17 July 1992) is a Canadian former professional ice hockey defender and current assistant coach of the Premier Hockey Federation's Metropolitan Riveters. Known for her gritty, stay-at-home style of play as a shutdown defender, she was the first player to serve as team captain in Riveters history, a role she would hold for three years until her initial retirement.

Playing career

Early career 
Johnston was born in 1992 in Burlington, Ontario, and is a graduate of Union College, where she played for the Union Dutchwomen ice hockey team. In the 2013-14 Union season, Johnston served as team captain.

Professional career 
Johnston joined the New York Riveters for the Premier Hockey Federation's (PHF) inaugural season in 2015–16 as a defenseman. She was elected as the franchise's first captain.

On 18 April 2016, Johnston signed a one-year contract worth $13,500 with the New York Riveters for the 2016–17 season, although salaries throughout the league were later cut up to 50% during the season. Johnston was selected for the 2017 All-Star Game as a media pick. Johnston was awarded the Denna Laing Award by the NWHL for her performance in the 2016–17 season, as selected by the Premier Hockey Federation Players' Association.

On 25 May 2017, Johnston re-signed with the New York Riveters for the 2017–18 season, continuing as captain. In October 2017, the New York Riveters were renamed the Metropolitan Riveters as part of a deal with the New Jersey Devils of the National Hockey League as the team was playing in Newark, New Jersey. The Riveters won the Isobel Cup that season, with Johnston earning her first career playoff point with an assist.

Following the 2017–18 season, Johnston announced her retirement from hockey. She made a comeback to return to the team for the 2019–20 season, earning three points in ten games. In May 2020, she announced her retirement to join the Riveters' coaching staff as an assistant coach. She had previously spent time as an assistant coach with the club while injured during the 2017–18 season.

Career statistics

Awards and honors
2012-13 Ashley Kilstein Award (Union Hockey Award)
2013-14 Ashley Kilstein Award (Union Hockey Award)

Personal life 
Outside of hockey, Johnston works as a mechanical engineer.

References

External links
 

1992 births
Canadian women's ice hockey defencemen
Ice hockey people from Ontario
Living people
Metropolitan Riveters players
New York Riveters players
Sportspeople from Burlington, Ontario
Union Dutchwomen ice hockey players